The following lists events that happened during 1951 in Laos.

Incumbents
Monarch: Sisavang Vong 
Prime Minister: 
 until 15 October: Phoui Sananikone 
 15 October-21 November: Savang Vatthana
 starting 21 November: Souvanna Phouma

Events

August
18 August — The National Progressive Party wins 19 out of 39 seats in the Parliament of Laos in the 1951 Laotian parliamentary election.

November
13 November — The first postage stamps of Laos are issued.

Births
date unknown - Pany Yathotou

References

 
1950s in Laos
Years of the 20th century in Laos
Laos
Laos